The discography of American indie rock band Sebadoh includes nine studio albums, three compilation albums, 10 extended plays (including two split 7-inches), and 13 singles.

Albums

Studio albums

Compilation albums

Extended plays

As sole artist

Collaborations

Singles

References 

Sebadoh
Discographies of American artists
Rock music group discographies